Fred Graham  (born 1928) is a New Zealand artist and educator recognised as a pioneer in the contemporary Māori art movement. In 2018 was the recipient of an Icon Award from the Arts Foundation of New Zealand, limited to 20 living art-makers.

Biography 
Graham was born in 1928 in Arapuni in South Waikato. He is affiliated with the Māori iwi Ngāti Korokī Kahukura and Tainui. He attended Taita College in Lower Hutt, and enjoyed art and photography there. He trained as a teacher at Ardmore Teachers' Training College and specialised in art in his third year. He taught art at schools and in the 1950s he worked as an arts advisor to Māori primary schools in Rotorua and Te Tai Tokerau. One of his students was Nigel Brown, who went on to become well known New Zealand artist.

Graham taught art at Palmerston North Teachers' Training College from 1957 until 1962. He has a studio in Waiuku and lives with his wife Norma. Graham was also a keen rugby player when he was younger and was briefly in the Māori All Blacks rugby team (he played three games with them).

Career 
Graham is known for his contemporary Māori art sculptures that reflect current themes and draw upon Māori traditions. He worked alongside other Māori artists such as Ralph Hotere, Cliff Whiting and Paratene Matchitt from the late 1950s in founding a contemporary Māori arts movement. He said in an interview on Radio New Zealand:In the 40s, just after the war, Māori art was traditional art – carving and that kind of thing. But for the first time a lot of Māori had gone to teachers' college and the ideas around that time were changing. As young students, we wanted to follow our own path rather than follow the traditional path.Grahams work has been exhibited and sold to collectors with both New Zealand and international interest.

Works 

Grahams' public sculptures are to be found in many places throughout New Zealand. This is a selection:
Justice – courtyard of the High Court at Auckland 
Te Waka Toi o Tamaki - wall outside Auckland Art Gallery  
Kaitiaki - Auckland Domain 
Kaitiaki II - corner of Shortland St and Queen St, Auckland metal bird – Mission Bay, Auckland
Manu Torino – Auckland Botanic Gardens
Falling Waters - the wall of the Alpha Motor Inn in Palmerston North (sold to the city in 2017)

Awards 
In 2017 Graham was awarded the Te Tohu mō Te Arikinui Dame Te Atairangikaahu (Exemplary/Supreme Award) in the Te Waka Toi Awards.

In 2018 Graham was named an Officer of the New Zealand Order of Merit in the New Years Honours List for his services to Māori art, and in the same year was made an Arts Foundation Icon.

References

Further reading 
 Te Tohunga Auaha: Fred Graham – Creator of Form by Maria de Jong, Fred Graham and Geoff Dale. Published: 20 June 2014 –

External links 

1928 births
Living people
New Zealand artists
People from Waikato
Officers of the New Zealand Order of Merit